Diplo, is a Tehsil in Tharparkar District, in the Sindh province of Pakistan. It is located in Thar desert.

Parbrahma Dham / Verijhap Dham 
Parbrahm Ashram ( پاربرهم ڌام ) also known as Verijhap Dham(ويڊيجپ ڌام)  or Chhari Saheb Dham (ڇڙي صاحب ڌام ) at Diplo taluka is an ancient Shiva Temple considered as Jyotirlinga where thousands of yatris arrive for "Divya Jyot Darshan" (Divine Light View) from a Jar.

References

Populated places in Sindh
Tharparkar District